The Team technical routine competition at the 2022 World Aquatics Championships was held on 19 and 21 June 2022.

Results
The preliminary round was started on 19 June at 10:00. The final was started on 21 June at 16:00. 

Green denotes finalists

References

Team technical routine